Angel City Football Club is a National Women's Soccer League expansion team that began play in 2022. The team is based in Los Angeles, California, and was announced on July 21, 2020. The team has many high-profile owners, including Natalie Portman, Eva Longoria, Mia Hamm, and Serena Williams.

The team is the Los Angeles area's first women's professional soccer team since the Los Angeles Sol of Women's Professional Soccer folded in 2010. Angel City FC plays their home matches at BMO Stadium, which it shares with Los Angeles FC of Major League Soccer.

History
On July 21, 2020, the National Women's Soccer League announced that Los Angeles would be awarded an expansion franchise for the 2022 season. The team was announced with a majority female ownership group led by actress Natalie Portman, venture capitalist Kara Nortman, entrepreneur Julie Uhrman, and venture capitalist Alexis Ohanian. Other founding members of the team included professional tennis player Serena Williams, actors Uzo Aduba, Jessica Chastain, America Ferrera, Jennifer Garner, and Eva Longoria, late night talk show host and YouTuber Lilly Singh, YouTuber Casey Neistat, Broadway Producer Jenna Segal, and former members of the United States national team including Julie Foudy, Mia Hamm, Rachel Van Hollebeke, Shannon Boxx, Amanda Cromwell, Lorrie Fair, Ronnie Fair, Joy Fawcett, Angela Hucles, Shannon MacMillan, Tisha Venturini, Saskia Webber, Lauren Holiday, and Abby Wambach.

It was also announced during the team's launch that they would be announcing their official name before the end of the year but were going to use 'Angel City' as a tentative nickname. The team was also in discussions with various groups for a stadium agreement, including the LA Galaxy of Major League Soccer.

In the time since the club's name was confirmed as Angel City FC on October 21, 2020, additional members of the ownership group were announced, among them tennis great Billie Jean King, former tennis player and current tennis administrator Ilana Kloss, WNBA star Candace Parker, NHL star P. K. Subban, actress and activist Sophia Bush, Latin pop star Becky G, actor and TV host James Corden, former US men's international soccer star Cobi Jones, NFL offensive lineman Ryan Kalil, and "The Vlog Squad" member Natalina Mariduena.

Angel City FC hosted Mexican football club Tigres UANL Femenil in the club’s first-ever International Friendly match in August 2022, which Angel City FC won 1-0. The first edition of the Copa Angelina on September 5, 2022 saw Angel City FC fall 2-0 to the Mexico women's national football team off a goal by Scarlett Camberos and an own goal.

Naming controversy

The announcement of the Angel City ownership group's franchise agreement caused backlash on social media among women's sports fans and particularly roller derby fans due to the long-standing existence of the popular Angel City Derby. The groundbreaking WFTDA team was established in 2005 by female skaters and consistently ranks among the top derby teams in the world. On October 21, 2020, the club officially confirmed that it would keep the name "Angel City Football Club".

Colors and crest 
Angel City FC's official colors are "asphalt" and "armour" with "sol rosa" as an accent color, a pink-tinted hue unique to the club.

On June 30, 2021, the club revealed its crest featuring an angel with wings inspired by the Southern California red-tailed hawk and shaped to mimic the area’s palm trees, with the top of the crest sloping at a 22-degree angle to represent their 2022 entry into the league. The crest was designed by Amedea Tassinari.

The club collaborated with supporters in the design of the colors, crest, and kit to ensure the club represented Los Angeles.

Sponsorship
On November 17, 2021 the club unveiled its primary kit which is made from recycled materials. The all-black primary look features hints of sol rosa and an art deco pattern. The kit will also feature an ‘empowering phrase’ above player names.

The club's eight-figure deal with DoorDash as the main kit sponsor is the largest in the NWSL.

Stadium
In November 2020, it was announced the team would play its home matches at BMO Stadium in Exposition Park near Downtown Los Angeles. BMO Stadium, formerly named Banc of California Stadium until 2023, is also home to Los Angeles FC of Major League Soccer.

Players and staff

Current squad

Out on loan

Management and staff

Records

Year-by-year

Head coaching record

Only competitive matches are counted. Includes NWSL regular season, playoffs, and Challenge Cup matches.

References

External links
 

 
2020 establishments in California
Association football clubs established in 2020
National Women's Soccer League teams
Soccer clubs in Los Angeles
Proposed sports teams
Sports in Los Angeles
Women's soccer clubs in the United States
Women's sports in California